Russula parvovirescens is a basidiomycete mushroom of the genus Russula. Found in the eastern United States, it was described as new to science in 2006. It is similar in appearance to the more widespread Russula virescens and R. crustosa, but can be distinguished from those species by its smaller stature, and microscopically by the voluminous terminal cells of the cap cuticle.

See also
List of Russula species

References

External links

Fungi described in 2006
Fungi of the United States
parvovirescens
Fungi without expected TNC conservation status